Sean Andrew Nowak (born 6 January 1987) is a South African cricketer. He is a right-handed batsman and a right-arm fast bowler who played for Northerns between 2008 and 2015. He was born in Pretoria.

Nowak made his first-class debut for Northerns against Free State in October 2008. Other teams he has played for include the Titans, Gloucestershire 2nd XI, Hampshire 2nd XI and Sussex 2nd XI (UK), along with representing the South African Universities cricket team. His local club was University of Pretoria (Tuks).

Currently, Nowak is the Physiotherapist for the Oman National Cricket Team.

References

External links

1987 births
Living people
South African cricketers
Northerns cricketers
Cricketers from Pretoria
Titans cricketers